Residence, 4 Oak Street, Yungaburra is a heritage-listed detached house at 4 Oak Street, Yungaburra, Tablelands Region, Queensland, Australia. It was built . It was added to the Queensland Heritage Register on 21 August 1992.

References

Attribution

External links 

Queensland Heritage Register
Buildings and structures in Yungaburra
Houses in Queensland
Articles incorporating text from the Queensland Heritage Register